Isaacs is a suburb in the district of Woden in Canberra, Australian Capital Territory. The postcode is 2607.

The suburb was gazetted as a Division Name on 12 May 1966 but residential housing was not built until the late 1980s. Isaacs is next to the suburbs of O'Malley, Mawson and Farrer. It is bounded by Yamba Drive and Ngunawal Drive. Located in the suburb is the Canberra Nature Park of Isaacs Ridge and the Long Gully pine plantation.

The suburb is named after Sir Isaac Isaacs (1855–1948), politician, Chief Justice and the first Australian-born Governor-General of Australia (1931–1936).

Demographics

Theme for streets

The suburb's theme is 'educationists': the streets are therefore named after people associated with Australian education. Some of the main streets in Isaacs, and their honorees, are:
Alexander Mackie Circuit: Alexander Mackie (1876–1955), academic who was first principal of the Sydney Teacher Training College and first Professor of Education at the University of Sydney (New South Wales)
Buntine Crescent: Walter Murray Buntine (1866–1953), teacher and campaigner for public education (Victoria)
Dorsch Street: Agnes Maria Johanna Dorsch (1871–1958), private teacher at Government House; teacher at Concordia College, 1923-43
Julia Flynn Avenue: Julia Teresa Flynn (1878–1947), secondary school teacher and school inspector (Victoria)
Maclagan Street: James B Maclagan (d. 1865), educationist who pioneered correspondence education (Western Australia)
Rowntree Crescent: Amy Rowntree, OBE (1885–1962), teacher, school inspector and historian (Tasmania)
Whitty Crescent: Ellen Whitty (Rev Mother Vincent) (1819–1892), social worker and missionary who established 26 Mercy schools and teacher training colleges (Queensland)
William Wilkins Crescent: William Wilkins (1827–1892), educational reformer and administrator, including Principal of Fort Street Model School (New South Wales)

Geology

Isaacs is built on Silurian age Deakin Volcanics.  These are green-grey and purple coloured rhyodacite.  The lower lying parts of the suburb are covered with Quaternary alluvium on top.  Isaacs ridge has the same outcrops as the rest of the suburb.

References

Suburbs of Canberra